Infanta Maria das Neves of Portugal (Portuguese: Maria das Neves Isabel Eulália Carlota Adelaide Micaela Gabriela Rafaela Gonzaga de Paula de Assis Inès Sofia Romana, Infanta de Portugal) (5 August 1852 – 15 February 1941) was the eldest child and daughter of exiled Miguel of Portugal and his wife Adelaide of Löwenstein-Wertheim-Rosenberg.

Maria was born in Kleinheubach, an Infanta of Portugal and member of the House of Braganza by birth. Until the birth of her brother Miguel, Duke of Braganza, Maria was titled Princess Royal of Portugal, a title of pretense, given her father had been deposed in 1834. Through her marriage to Alfonso Carlos of Bourbon, Duke of San Jaime, Carlist claimant to the Spanish throne, Maria was titular Queen consort of Spain, France, and Navarre.

Marriage
Maria married Alfonso Carlos of Bourbon, Duke of San Jaime, second son of Juan, Count of Montizón and his wife Archduchess Maria Beatrix of Austria-Este, on 26 April 1871 in Kleinheubach.
Alfonso Carlos was her first cousin once removed, as Maria's father (Miguel of Portugal) and his paternal grandmother (Infanta Maria Francisca of Portugal) were siblings.
Their union produced only a son who died some hours after his birth, in 1874. They were unable to have more children and died childless.
Maria died in Vienna, Austria, aged 88.

See also
Descendants of Miguel I of Portugal

Ancestry

References

|-

|-

1852 births
1941 deaths
Portuguese infantas
House of Braganza
People from Kleinheubach
19th-century Portuguese people
19th-century Portuguese women
Dames of the Order of Saint Isabel
Daughters of kings